Merism is a rhetorical device (or figure of speech) in which a combination of two contrasting parts of the whole refer to the whole. 

For example, in order to say that someone "searched everywhere", one could use the merism "searched high and low". Another example is the sword-and-sandal movie genre, a loose term for a genre of movies made principally in Italy in the 1950s and 1960s set in Classical antiquity.

Merisms are common in the Old Testament. For example, in Genesis 1:1, when God creates את השמים ואת הארץ (Modern pronunciation: et hashamaim ve-et haarets) "the heavens and the earth" (New Revised Standard Version), the two parts (heavens and earth) do not refer only to the heavens and the earth. Rather, they refer to the heavens, the earth and everything between them, i.e. God created the entire world, the whole universe. Other famous examples of Biblical merisms are Genesis 1:5, where "evening" and "morning" refer to "one day" (including noon, afternoon etc.); and Psalm 139, where the psalmist declares that God knows "my downsitting and my uprising", i.e. God knows all the psalmist’s actions.

Etymology
The term entered English in 1894 in the biological sense, but had appeared earlier in rhetorical contexts where it denoted "'synecdoche in which totality is expressed by contrasting parts' (such as high and low, young and old)". It derives from Modern Latin merismus, from Greek μερισμός merismos 'a dividing or partitioning', ultimately from merizein 'to divide', from meros 'part, share'.

Biological usage
In biology, a merism is a repetition of similar parts in the structure of an organism (Bateson 1894). Such features are called meristic characters, and the study of such characters is called meristics. An example is in flowers, considering the number of parts in each whorl of organs from which they are constructed.

Legal usage

Merisms frequently figure in the writing of lawyers, and are a hallmark of legal style.  The two parts of the legal merism "Last Will and Testament" at one time referred to two documents, enforced in two separate courts: the will disposed of a decedent's real property while the testament disposed of chattels.  It became customary to combine the instruments in a single dispositive document, and the name has continued long after the doctrines that required its use became obsolete in common law.

A lawyer who writes a will typically includes a residuary clause that disposes of any property not covered by a prior section.  The weight of tradition is such that the lawyer writing such a document will often phrase it something like this:

Traditionally, a gift of real property was called a "devise" whereas a gift of other property was a "bequest". Nowadays, the words "bequeath" and "devise" are synonymous in most jurisdictions so that "I bequeath the rest of my property to ..." is enough in both law and logic to achieve the same result.  Many deeds frequently contain a traditional clause that says that the grantee is "to have and to hold" the property conveyed; this usage goes back to the days in which the instruments were drawn up in Latin, and is sometimes called a "habendam et tenendam" clause.  The use of legal merisms seldom if ever adds legal effect to the document that contains them, and frequently increases their reading difficulty.  However, the weight of tradition and the fear that a deviation from the established formula might have unintended legal consequences makes lawyers reluctant to revise the traditional formulae, and their clients, seeing them, at least draw the satisfaction of knowing that their documents appear to be written by a lawyer.

In some cases, the doubling (or even tripling) of constituent parts in these meristic constructions arose as a result of the transition of legal discourse from Latin to French, and then from French to English. During such periods, key terms were paired with synonyms from multiple languages in an attempt to prevent ambiguity and ensure hermeneutic consistency.

See also 

 Synecdoche, referring to a whole by the name of one of its parts (or vice versa):
 Pars pro toto, where the part is used to refer to the whole.
 Totum pro parte, where the whole is used to refer to a part.
 Lock, stock, and barrel

References

Further reading
William Bateson, Materials For The Study Of Variation: Treated With Especial Regard To Discontinuity In The Origin Of Species (Macmillan and Co., 1894)
Bryan A. Garner, The Elements of Legal Style.  (Oxford, 2001.  )
Calvert Watkins, How to Kill a Dragon: Aspects of Indo-European Poetics (Oxford, 2001.  )

Rhetoric
Figures of speech
Legal terminology
Legal history